The 2015–16 UCLA Bruins men's basketball team represented the University of California, Los Angeles, during the 2015–16 NCAA Division I men's basketball season. They finished the season with a 15–17 record, the fourth time the program finished with a losing record since 1948, when John Wooden became their coach. The Bruins were led by third-year head coach Steve Alford and played their home games at Pauley Pavilion as members in the Pac-12 Conference. Isaac Hamilton earned second-team All-Pac-12 honors, the only Bruin named to the all-conference team.

With Kevon Looney having moved on to the National Basketball Association (NBA), sophomore Thomas Welsh was promoted to UCLA's starting lineup at center, while center Tony Parker moved to forward. Freshman guard Aaron Holiday also opened the season as a starter, teaming with Hamilton and Bryce Alford to form a three-guard lineup. The Bruins lost their season opener to Monmouth and lost consecutive games in the Maui Invitational to Kansas and Wake Forest. However, they recovered to upset then-No. 1 Kentucky 87–77 at home and defeated then-No. 20 Gonzaga 71–66 on the road. UCLA finished their non-conference schedule winning six of their last seven games, and entered Pac-12 play at 9–4 and ranked No. 25 in the nation. They were comparatively better than a year earlier, when they entered conference play with five losses and a three-game losing streak.

The Bruins had an early conference win against then-No. 7 Arizona, but they were 4–5 halfway through the Pac-12 schedule, including 0–4 against the three teams with the quickest pace in the conference, Washington, USC, and Oregon. Their defense was weakened without comparable replacements for Looney and Norman Powell, a senior from the prior season, and sophomore György Golomán had been out for much of the season with a stress fracture in his leg. UCLA coach Steve Alford believed his big front court was "slow" and had sophomore Jonah Bolden start in place of the senior Parker. While Bolden was  taller than Parker, he was also  lighter. UCLA began their second half with a loss to USC, who swept the Bruins for the first time since 2010. The Bruins lost both games in their crosstown rivalry by double digits for the first time since 1938. In their next game, UCLA blew a 10-point halftime lead to Arizona en route to their fifth loss in seven games. The loss dropped them out of all major NCAA tournament projections and mired in 10th place in the Pac-12. The Bruins were eliminated from the Pac-12 tournament after a 95–71 loss to USC, losing three consecutive times in the same season to the Trojans for the first time in 74 years. UCLA missed the NCAA Tournament for just the third time in 10 years.

Previous season

The Bruins finished in fourth place (11–7) in the Pac-12 conference. They earned a No. 11 seed in the NCAA Championship tournament, and advanced to the Sweet 16, becoming the lowest-seed UCLA team to ever reach the regional semifinals. They defeated SMU 60–59 in the second round and UAB 92–75 in the third round. Then the Bruins lost to Gonzaga for the second time of the season, 74-62 in the Sweet Sixteen. The program produced its 49th 20-win season. Norman Powell led the team in scoring with 16.4 points per game, followed by Bryce Alford with 15.4 points per game.

Off-season

Departures

Incoming transfers

2015 recruiting class

Roster

Schedule

UCLA's 2015–16 schedule includes home games against Kentucky, Long Beach State, Pepperdine, Cal Poly, Louisiana-Lafayette, Monmouth, Cal State Northridge, and McNeese State. UCLA will travel to play at Gonzaga and face off against North Carolina at a neutral venue. The Bruins will also make a trip to play three of the following in the Maui Invitational: Kansas, Indiana, St. John's, UNLV, Vanderbilt, and Wake Forest.

During the Pac-12 Conference schedule, UCLA will play 18 games (9 home and 9 away) and will have home-and-homes with the following teams: Arizona, Arizona State, Oregon, Oregon State, USC, Washington, and Washington State. The Bruins will only play the Rocky Mountain teams (Colorado and Utah) at home. UCLA will also only play the Bay area teams (California and Stanford) on the road.

|-
!colspan=12 style="background:#; color:#;"| Exhibition

|-
!colspan=12 style="background:#; color:#;"| Non-conference regular season

|-
!colspan=12 style="background:#;"| Pac-12 regular season

|-
!colspan=12 style="background:#;"| Pac-12 Tournament

|-

Ranking movement

Notes
 December 7, 2015 – Thomas Welsh was named Pac-12 Player of the Week
 January 11, 2016 – Bryce Alford was named Pac-12 Player of the Week
 March 5, 2016 – Forward/center Tony Parker was honored on Senior Day
 March 24, 2016 – Sophomore center Thomas Welsh was named to the second-team Pac-12 All-Academic team

References

External links
2015-16 UCLA Bruins Roster and Stats at Sports-Reference.com

UCLA
UCLA Bruins men's basketball seasons
UCLA Bruins men's basketball
UCLA Bruins men's basketball